The 2018 FIFA Club World Cup (officially known as the FIFA Club World Cup UAE 2018 presented by Alibaba Cloud for sponsorship reasons) was the 15th edition of the FIFA Club World Cup, a FIFA-organised international club football tournament between the winners of the six continental confederations, as well as the host nation's league champions. The tournament was hosted by the United Arab Emirates from 12 to 22 December 2018.

Real Madrid were the defending champions, having won the previous two editions, and qualified for the 2018 edition as well. They successfully defended their title (their third consecutive) after defeating Al-Ain 4–1 in the final. With the win, they broke the tie with their club rivals Barcelona to become the outright record winners of the competition.

Host bids
The application process for the 2017–2018 as well as the 2015–2016 editions, i.e. two hosts, each hosting two years, began in February 2014. Member associations interested in hosting must submit a declaration of interest by 30 March 2014, and provide the complete set of bidding documents by 25 August 2014. The FIFA Executive Committee was to select the hosts at their meeting in Morocco in December 2014, but the final decision was delayed until the FIFA Executive Committee meetings on 19–20 March 2015.

The following countries expressed an interest in bidding to host the tournament:

The FIFA Executive Committee officially confirmed the United Arab Emirates as hosts of the 2017 and 2018 tournaments on 20 March 2015 during their meeting in Zürich, Switzerland.

Qualified teams
The following teams qualified for the tournament.

Notes

Venues
The two venues were the Zayed Sports City Stadium in Abu Dhabi and the Hazza bin Zayed Stadium in Al Ain.

Match officials
A total of six referees, twelve assistant referees, and six video assistant referees were appointed for the tournament. FIFA announced on 22 November 2018 that the trio of referees and assistant referees from CAF were changed.

Notes

Squads

Each team had to name a 23-man squad (three of whom must be goalkeepers). Injury replacements were allowed until 24 hours before the team's first match.

Matches
The draw of the tournament was held on 4 September 2018, 10:00 CEST (UTC+2), at the FIFA Headquarters in Zürich, to decide the matchups of the second round (between the first round winner and teams from AFC, CAF, and CONCACAF), and the opponents of the two second round winners in the semi-finals (teams from CONMEBOL and UEFA). At the time of the draw, the identity of the teams from AFC, CAF and CONMEBOL were not known.

If a match was tied after normal playing time:
For elimination matches, extra time would be played. If still tied after extra time, a penalty shoot-out would be held to determine the winner.
For the matches for fifth place and third place, no extra time would be played, and a penalty shoot-out would be held to determine the winner.

All times are local, GST (UTC+4).

First round

Second round

Match for fifth place

Semi-finals

Match for third place

Final

Goalscorers

1 own goal
 Léo Silva (Kashima Antlers, against Guadalajara)
 Yahya Nader (Al-Ain, against Real Madrid)

Awards

The following awards were given at the conclusion of the tournament.

FIFA also named a man of the match for the best player in each game at the tournament.

References

External links
FIFA Club World Cup UAE 2018, FIFA.com

 
2018
2018 in association football
2018
2018–19 in Emirati football
December 2018 sports events in Asia
Sport in Al Ain
Sports competitions in Abu Dhabi